The Secret of Monte Cristo (French: Le secret de Monte-Cristo) is a 1948 French historical drama film directed by Albert Valentin and starring Pierre Brasseur, Georges Vitray and Pierre Larquey. The film is based on the purported real story behind the Alexandre Dumas novel The Count of Monte Cristo.

Cast
 Pierre Brasseur as François Picault
 Georges Vitray as Gervais Chambard
 Pierre Larquey as Jacob Muller
 Marcelle Derrien as Isabelle
 Madeleine Lebeau as Marguerite Vigouroux
 Edmond Ardisson as Guilhem Savori	
 Robert Dalban as Mathieu Loupian		
 Marcel Delaître as La'abbé Farina
 Liliane Guyot as La marquise
 Charles Lemontier as Antoine Hallu
 Julien Maffre as Le policier
 Jacqueline Marbaux as Jeanne Hallu
 René Marc as Le médecin
 Jean Marsan as Le vendeur
 Georges Paulais as Le préfet
 Gilles Quéant as Rémi
 Émile Ronet as Monsieur Bastien
 Georges Saint-Val as Le voisin
 Victor Vina as Le maire
 René Wilmet as Alexandre Dumas

References

Bibliography 
 Bessy, Maurice & Chirat, Raymond. ''Histoire du cinéma français: encyclopédie des films, 1940–1950. Pygmalion, 1986

External links 
 

1948 films
1940s historical drama films
French historical drama films
1940s French-language films
Films directed by Albert Valentin
Films set in the 19th century
1940s French films

fr:Le Secret de Monte-Cristo